Abdullah Kanno (born 6 March 1990) is a Saudi professional footballer who plays for Al-Safa as a defender.

Club career

Al-Taawoun
In 20 June 2015, Al-Taawoun signed Abdullah Kanno from Al-Qadisah with a three-year contract. In 8 May 2016, Abdullah played his debut against Al-Wehda, which they the match 2-1. In 4 May 2017, Abdullah played his last match for Al-Taawoun against Al-Ahli which they lost 2-1. In 6 June 2017, Al-Taawoun ended Abdullah's contract by mutual consent.

Al-Fayha
On 6 July 2017, Abdullah signed a three-year contract with newly promoted Al-Fayha. On 10 August 2017, Abdullah Kanno made his debut for Al-Fayha against Al-Hilal, which they lost 2-1.

Hounors

Al-Qadisah
Saudi First Division (1): 2014-15

Al-Hazem
MS League: 2020–21

References

External links
 

1990 births
Living people
People from Khobar
Saudi Arabian footballers
Al-Qadsiah FC players
Al-Taawoun FC players
Al-Fayha FC players
Al-Kawkab FC players
Al-Hazem F.C. players
Al Safa FC players
Al-Nahda Club (Saudi Arabia) players
Saudi First Division League players
Saudi Professional League players
Saudi Second Division players
Association football defenders